Daniel Elsner (born 4 January 1979) is a former professional German tennis player.

Juniors

Elsner was an outstanding juniors player. He won 3 consecutive juniors grand slam singles titles: the 1996 Juniors U.S. Open, the 1997 Juniors Australian Open, and 1997 Juniors French Open; as well as making the finals of the subsequent 1997 Juniors Wimbledon. He is one of only 12 male players (as of May 2017) to win at least 3 junior grand slam singles titles, and one of only 4 to do so consecutively.  He was a World No. 1 junior player in singles.

ATP Tour

Elsner turned professional in 1997 and won several futures tournaments, but had limited success on the ATP tour. His professional highlight was making the semi-finals of the Stuttgart Open in 2000, beating then ATP world No. 2 ranked Magnus Norman en route 46 76 64. He obtained a career high rank of 92 during that year. His best grand slam result was the 2nd round of the French Open in 2004. He last played on the ATP World Tour in October, 2008.

Junior Grand Slam finals

Singles: 4 (3 titles, 1 runner-up)

Doubles: 1 (1 runner-up)

ATP Challenger and ITF Futures finals

Singles: 19 (14–5)

Doubles: 4 (1–3)

Performance timeline

Singles

See also
List of Grand Slam boys' singles champions

References

External links
 
 

1979 births
Living people
Australian Open (tennis) junior champions
French Open junior champions
German male tennis players
People from Unterallgäu
Sportspeople from Swabia (Bavaria)
US Open (tennis) junior champions
Grand Slam (tennis) champions in boys' singles
Tennis people from Bavaria